Ajit Sarkar (1947 – 14 June 1998) was Indian politician who was a member of the Communist Party of India (Marxist).

Political career 
He entered politics through the Students' Federation of India, the CPI(M)’s student wing, and is still remembered in these parts as a firebrand leader who took up the cause of the landless and the poor.

He represented Purnia four times in the  Bihar Legislative Assembly between 1980 and 1998 for 18 years until 14 June 1998 when he was gunned down with his driver Harendra Sharma and party worker Ashfaqur Rehman in broad daylight at Subhash Nagar in Purnia.

His story was shown in one of the episodes of Satyamev Jayate on politics.

Personal life 
His son Amit Sarkar has been living in Australia with his Australian wife and 2 kids. He dwelt in politics for some time.

References

Bihar MLAs 1980–1985
1947 births
1998 deaths
People murdered in Bihar
People from Purnia
Communist Party of India (Marxist) politicians from Bihar
Bihar MLAs 1985–1990
Bihar MLAs 1990–1995
Bihar MLAs 1995–2000
Deaths by firearm in India
Assassinated Indian politicians